KMTC (91.9 FM) is a radio station licensed to Russellville, Arkansas, United States, and serving the Arkansas River Valley. The station is owned by Russellville Educational Broadcast Foundation.

Specialty shows
KMTC produces two teaching programs in-house. "Jesus Is Alive" with Tom Underhill which airs daily and "Go Light Your World" with Bonnie Underhill and Susan Allen which airs Monday through Friday.

References

External links
 Official Website

MTC